Anton Ryen (15 December 1894  –  17 February 1968) was a Norwegian politician for the Farmers' Party.

He was born in Vågå.

He was elected to the Norwegian Parliament from Oppland in 1945, and was re-elected on two occasions.

References

1894 births
1968 deaths
Members of the Storting
Centre Party (Norway) politicians
20th-century Norwegian politicians